, professionally known under the mononym  is a Japanese voice actress and singer from Kobe, Hyōgo Prefecture who is affiliated with the talent agency Hibiki. After aspiring to become an entertainer for part of her life, she started her singing career in 2011 after winning an audition to become part of the Tantei Opera Milky Holmes franchise. That same year, she made her solo music debut with the release of her first single "Tenshi no Clover"; the title song was used as the opening theme to the anime series Astarotte no Omocha!.

Aimi is a member of the singing unit Feathers, together with fellow voice actress Ayasa Itō. She is also the voice of the idol Julia in the game The Idolmaster Million Live!, and the voice of Kasumi Toyama in the multimedia franchise BanG Dream!; Aimi also performs live as part of the BanG Dream! in-universe band Poppin'Party.

Biography

Terakawa was born in Hyōgo Prefecture on December 25, 1991. She had aspired to become a singer since childhood. During her high school years, she taught herself how to play the guitar and perform in a band. She initially only aspired to become a singer, but she became interested in voice acting after becoming familiar with the anime series Macross Frontier, where she was impressed at how the series was able to combine music and animation in its storytelling. Hoping to become a professional singer, she began participating at various singing contests, such as the  Animax Anison Grand Prix in 2009. She also performed at various live venues, including a steakhouse in Kobe.

Terakawa's entertainment career began after passing an audition to become a part of the Tantei Opera Milky Holmes multimedia franchise. She made her voice acting debut with the franchise as the character Kazumi Tokiwa. As part of the franchise, she then became a member of the music group Feathers together with fellow voice actress Ayasa Itō. She later changed her stage name to the mononym Aimi, starting with the release of her first solo single  on May 3, 2011; the title song was used as the opening theme to the anime series Astarotte no Omocha!. Also in 2013, Aimi held her 1st solo live [A LIVE] http://www.unknown24.net/bbrk/20080907/qb, where she sang her full discography with a total of 14 songs. She would then release four more singles between 2011 and 2013, with the title tracks of her singles being used in anime series such as Ben-To, The Ambition of Oda Nobuna, Fairy Tail, and The Severing Crime Edge.

In 2012, Aimi was a guest at Anime Expo as part of promotions for the Cardfight!! Vanguard franchise. She was then cast as the character Julia in the mobile game The Idolmaster Million Live!. She would then release her first full album Love in November 2013. In 2015, she became part of the multimedia project BanG Dream!, playing the series' protagonist Kasumi Toyama and performing live as part of the in-universe band Poppin'Party.

In December 2020, Aimi announced she would release a solo single in spring 2021 under the King Records label.

On September 1, 2021, Aimi revealed that her younger sister is Chiharu, who was the voice actress of character Reika Satō in the idol girl group 22/7, and had recently joined Hibiki.

Filmography

Anime series
2011
Cardfight!! Vanguard, Suiko

2012
Cardfight!! Vanguard: Asia Circuit, Suiko
Gon, Female Elephant, Frog 3

2013
Cardfight!! Vanguard: Link Joker, Suiko Tatsunagi
Freezing Vibration, Roxanne Elipton
Robocar Poli, Benny
Futari wa Milky Holmes, Kazumi Tokiwa
The "Hentai" Prince and the Stony Cat., Emi, Emanuela Pollarola

2014
Argevollen, Hikaru Rikuru
Cardfight!! Vanguard: Legion Mate, Suiko Tatsunagi
Chō-Bakuretsu I-Jigen Menko Battle Gigant Shooter Tsukasa, Ataru Dōmoto, Ruri Dōmoto
Future Card Buddyfight, Kiri Hyoryu
Engaged to the Unidentified, Mayura Momouchi
Oneechan ga Kita, Tomoya Mizuhara
Recently, My Sister Is Unusual, Moa Torii

2015
Cardfight!! Vanguard G: GIRS Crisis , Am Chouno
Chaos Dragon, Ulrika Ledesma
Plastic Memories, Sherry
Tantei Kageki Milky Holmes TD, Kazumi Tokiwa

2016
Luck & Logic, Yukari Nanahoshi

2017
BanG Dream!, Kasumi Toyama

2018
BanG Dream! Girls Band Party! Pico, Kasumi Toyama

2019
Afterlost, Kikyō
BanG Dream! 2nd Season, Kasumi Toyama
BanG Dream! Film Live, Kasumi Toyama
Senki Zesshō Symphogear XV, Millaarc

2020
BanG Dream! 3rd Season, Kasumi Toyama
BanG Dream! Girls Band Party! Pico: Ohmori, Kasumi Toyama
D4DJ First Mix, Kyoko Yamate

2021
BanG Dream! Girls Band Party! Pico Fever!, Kasumi Toyama
Battle Game in 5 Seconds, Yūri Amagake
D4DJ Petit Mix, Kyoko Yamate
How a Realist Hero Rebuilt the Kingdom, Carla Vargas
Remake Our Life!, Nanako Kogure

2022
Life with an Ordinary Guy Who Reincarnated into a Total Fantasy Knockout, Curme, Maid chief
Love Live! Nijigasaki High School Idol Club 2nd Season , Jennifer
Teppen!!!!!!!!!!!!!!! Laughing 'til You Cry, Yomogi Takahashi

2023
Mahō Shōjo Magical Destroyers, Blue
Helck, Iris
TenPuru, Yuzuki Aoba

Anime films
2021
BanG Dream! Episode of Roselia I: Promise, Kasumi Toyama
BanG Dream! Film Live 2nd Stage, Kasumi Toyama

2022
BanG Dream! Poppin'Dream!, Kasumi Toyama
Suzume, Miki

Video games
2013
The Idolmaster Million Live!, Julia
2015
Disgaea 5: Alliance of Vengeance, Liezerota
2016
Girls' Frontline, MDR, TAC-50
2017
BanG Dream! Girls Band Party!, Kasumi Toyama
 The Idolmaster Million Live! Theater Days, Julia
2020
Pokémon Masters, Zinnia
2021
Alchemy Stars, Nemesis, Rabbie
Cookie Run: Kingdom, Parfait Cookie
Konosuba: Fantastic Days, Mel
2022
Heaven Burns Red, Ichigo Minase
TBA
Brown Dust 2, Scheherazade
Honkai: Star Rail, Serval

Discography

Album
Love (Pony Canyon, November 6, 2013)
Singles
"Tenshi no CLOVER" (Pony Canyon, May 3, 2011) – Astarotte no Omocha! opening
"LIVE for LIFE -Ōkami-tachi no Yoru-" (Pony Canyon, November 2, 2011) – Ben-To opening
"Link" (Pony Canyon, July 18, 2012) – Oda Nobuna no Yabō opening
"We're the stars" (Pony Canyon, February 27, 2013) – Fairy Tail ending
"Unmei no Ori" (Pony Canyon, April 17, 2013) – The Severing Crime Edge opening
"ReSTARTING!!" (King Records, April 7, 2021)
"Kazanear" (King Records, July 28, 2021) – How a Realist Hero Rebuilt the Kingdom ending

References

External links
  
  
 Official agency profile 
 

1991 births
Living people
Anime singers
Japanese women pop singers
Japanese video game actresses
Japanese voice actresses
Voice actresses from Hyōgo Prefecture
21st-century Japanese actresses
21st-century Japanese singers
21st-century Japanese women singers